Cryptotreta pallida is a species of tephritid or fruit flies in the genus Cryptotreta of the family Tephritidae.

Distribution
Mexico.

References

Tephritinae
Insects described in 1923
Diptera of North America